Rajjar 2 is a Union council in Charsadda District of Khyber-Pakhtunkhwa.

See also
 Rajjar 1

References

Union councils of Charsadda District
Populated places in Charsadda District, Pakistan